Meng Jinxi (born September 1944) is a lieutenant general in the People's Liberation Army of China who served as commander of the Tibet Military District from 1996 to 2004. He was a member of the 16th Central Committee of the Chinese Communist Party.  He was a delegate to the 9th National People's Congress. He was a member of the Standing Committee of the 11th Chinese People's Political Consultative Conference.

Biography
Meng was born in Chongqing, in September 1944. He secondary studied at Chongqing Jianshan High School and graduated from the PLA Military Academy. 

He enlisted in the People's Liberation Army (PLA) in September 1961, and joined the Chinese Communist Party (CCP) in November 1964. He served in the Kunming Military District from July 1964 to November 1969 and the 94th Regiment of the 32nd Division of the PLA Ground Force from November 1969 to September 1980. He led the regiment to fame in the Sino-Vietnamese War. 

He was commander of the 14th Group Army in September 1985, and held that office until September 1988. He became vice president of the PLA Kunming Army College in July 1989, concurrently serving as head of the Training Department. He became deputy commander of the Guizhou Military District in August 1992, and served until June 1996, when he was promoted to become commander of the Tibet Military District. In June 2000, he was admitted to member of the Standing Committee of the CCP Tibet Autonomous Regional Committee, the region's top authority. He took up the post of deputy commander of the Chengdu Military Region which he held from July 2001 to December 2007, although he remained commander of the Tibet Military District until September 2004.

He was promoted to the rank of major general (shaojiang) in September 1988 and lieutenant general (zhongjiang) in July 2002.

References

1944 births
Living people
People's Liberation Army generals from Chongqing
People's Republic of China politicians from Chongqing
Chinese Communist Party politicians from Chongqing
Members of the 16th Central Committee of the Chinese Communist Party
Delegates to the 9th National People's Congress
Members of the Standing Committee of the 11th Chinese People's Political Consultative Conference